Bellium bellidioides is a species of plant in the family Asteraceae. It is endemic to the Balearic Islands, Corsica and Sardinia in the Mediterranean and has been introduced to the England and Scotland.

References 

Astereae
Flora of Corsica
Flora of Sardinia
Flora of the Balearic Islands
Plants described in 1771
Taxa named by Carl Linnaeus